Beyond Records was a Norwegian record label founded in Bodø in 2011 and closed down in 2014. The record label released albums and singles with artists such as Cold Mailman, Eline Thorp and the platinum selling pop duo Sirkus Eliassen.

Signed artists
Cold Mailman
Eline Thorp
Magnus Eliassen
Sirkus Eliassen
Sondre Justad

Discography

Album/EP

Singles

See also
 List of record labels

References

External links
 Facebook
 Spotify

Record labels established in 2011
Norwegian independent record labels